Valley High School is a public high school in the city limits of Albuquerque, New Mexico, United States. It is part of the Albuquerque Public Schools district. The school opened in 1954 and enrolls around 1,800 students.

Athletics
VHS competes in the New Mexico Activities Association (NMAA), as a class 6A school in District 5. In 2014, the NMAA realigned the state's schools in to six classifications and adjusted district boundaries. In addition to Valley High School, the schools in District 5-6A include West Mesa High School, Rio Grande High School, Albuquerque High School and Atrisco Heritage Academy High School.

Notable alumni 
 Brittney Barreras, former member of the New Mexico House of Representatives
Patti Cohenour, actress
Charles Duhigg, Pulitzer Prize-winning reporter and best-selling author
 Arian Foster, former running back for the Houston Texans and Miami Dolphins
 Sid Gutierrez, astronaut
 Shammara Henderson, judge of the New Mexico Court of Appeals
 Minka Kelly, actress
 Michael Larson, investment manager
 Joby Sanchez (class of 2009), mixed martial artist
 Bobby Shew, jazz trumpeter
 Gregory Zanetti, military officer and politician

References

External links 
 http://www.vhsvikings.com/

Educational institutions established in 1954
High schools in Albuquerque, New Mexico
Public high schools in New Mexico
1954 establishments in New Mexico